Indus was launched in 1813 at Newcastle-upon-Tyne. She initially traded as a West Indiaman. In 1820–1821 she probably made one voyage carrying cargo from Batavia, Dutch East Indies, to Hamburg and Antwerp. After the probably voyage to Batavia Indus traded between Liverpool and Canada. The cargo that Indus carried from Canada back to Liverpool consisted mainly of lumber, including staves. Her surviving crew members abandoned Indus on 8 January 1839 after she became waterlogged.

Career
Henry Wright, South Shields and William Wright, Newcastle, built Indus for their own account.
 
Indus first appeared in Lloyd's Register (LR) in 1814. 

The Registers were only as accurate as owners choose to keep them. Between 1820 and 1822 two vessels named Indus, one with Jackson, master, and one with Wright, master, sailed to Batavia from Newcastle. Neither combination appears in Lloyd's Register or the Register of Shipping. However, the ship arrival and departure data also does not show any data for Indus, Callender, master. Indus, Wright, master, sailed via Saint Helena on both her out bound and return voyages. She stopped at Portsmouth on 20 July 1821 on her way back from Batavia, and was put into quarantine. Her crew was sickly and she had lost nine men to fever and other contagious diseases.  On 25 July she went on to Antwerp. By discharging her cargo in Antwerp she was not in violation of the British East India Company's monopoly on trade between Great Britain and ports east of the Cape of Good Hope.

Fate
Her crew abandoned Indus on 8 January 1839 on the Dogger Bank in the North Sea off the coast of Jutland. She was waterlogged and Felicity rescued four surviving crew, the remainder being dead. Indus was on a voyage from Quebec City, to Newcastle upon Tyne. Two days later her crew and the survivors abandoned Felicity, of Rochester, which now too was in a sinking state. Lydia, of Aberdeen rescued the survivors and brought them into Hartlepool on 17 January.

Citations

1813 ships
Ships built on the River Tyne
Age of Sail merchant ships of England
Maritime incidents in January 1839